Luca Brecel (born 8 March 1995) is a Belgian professional snooker player. He won the European Under-19 title at the age of 14 and went on to break Stephen Hendry's record as the youngest player ever to compete at the Crucible Theatre. He made his debut at the 2012 World Championship aged 17 years and 45 days, almost two months younger than Hendry in 1986.

In 2017, Brecel became the first player from mainland Europe to win a ranking event when he defeated Shaun Murphy in the final of the China Championship. He reached his first Triple Crown final at the 2021 UK Championship, but lost 5–10 to Zhao Xintong. He claimed his second ranking title a week later, defeating John Higgins 9–5 to win the 2021 Scottish Open.

Amateur career
Brecel started playing snooker when he was nine, and scored his first competitive century break at 12. In April 2009, he became the youngest European Under-19 champion at 14 years of age in a victory against Michael Wasley in Saint Petersburg. In the Grand Final of the World Series of Snooker in Portugal in May, Brecel beat six-time World Championship runner-up Jimmy White by 4–3 and 1997 world champion Ken Doherty by 5–3. He lost 4–5 to 2006 world champion Graeme Dott in the quarter-finals. In August 2009, he beat Joe Perry, the then world number 12, at the Paul Hunter Classic.

In January 2010, Brecel had a 4–1 victory against seven-time world champion Stephen Hendry in an exhibition game in Bruges. In May of that year, Brecel beat professional compatriot Bjorn Haneveer by 7–4 to become Belgian senior champion. His break of 136 was the highest of the tournament. Brecel was one of eight players who participated in the new Power Snooker tournament at the indigO2 in October 2010, alongside then reigning world champion Neil Robertson, Ding Junhui, Mark Selby, Ali Carter, Shaun Murphy, Jimmy White, and Ronnie O'Sullivan. Brecel was defeated by eventual winner O'Sullivan in the first round. In December 2010, Brecel was named Belgian Sportsman of the Year in the Promising Talent category.

Professional career

2011/12 season

In May 2011, Brecel received a wild card for the main tour of the professional 2011–12 season. Brecel turned professional in the following month, beating Anthony Hamilton in his first official professional match. By August, he was ranked number 87 on the world rankings; fellow Belgian Bjorn Haneveer was ranked 65 at the time. In January 2012, Brecel made his first Maximum break in an amateur tournament.

Brecel played in all 12 of the minor-ranking Players Tour Championship events throughout the season, with his best finishes coming in Event 2, Event 8 and Event 9, where he reached the last 32 each time. He finished 69th on the Order of Merit.

Brecel became the youngest ever player to qualify for the World Snooker Championship in 2012, after defeating Ian McCulloch, Barry Pinches, Michael Holt and Mark King. In doing so he broke the record of Stephen Hendry from 1986, as he was almost 2 months older than Brecel. He also became one of five players to qualify for the tournament under 18 years of age and played in his first ranking event main draw, but lost 5–10 in the first round against Stephen Maguire.

Although finishing the season outside the top 64 who automatically retain their places on the snooker tour, Brecel received a two-year wildcard, along with Tony Drago. World Snooker chairman, Barry Hearn said the decision was made as it would be a "loss to the sport" if Brecel did not feature. Brecel was awarded the Rookie of the Year Award at the World Snooker Annual Award Ceremony.

2012/13 season
In July 2012, Brecel made his second 147 break in an amateur tournament. In qualifying for the first ranking event of the season, the 2012 Wuxi Classic, Brecel reached the third qualifying round but ultimately lost 5–4 to Jamie Burnett. He made three century breaks.

Next up for Brecel was the first PTC event of the year. The teenager had a good run, beating former world champions Graeme Dott and Ken Doherty on his way to the last 16 where he met Judd Trump who beat him 4–1. Brecel made two centuries in the tournament. Brecel was beaten in the first round of the second PTC event of the year, 4–2, by Matthew Selt. He fared a little better in the first European Tour event of the season reaching the last 64 but was beaten 4–3 by Rory McLeod. The Belgian was also knocked out in the last 64 of the third PTC of the season, 4–1, by Chinese player Xiao Guodong. He made one century in the tournament. Brecel lost in the last 64 of both the Gdynia Open (where he made a century) and the Antwerp Open to Mark Joyce and Stuart Bingham respectively. The Belgian was eliminated in the first round of the fourth PTC event of the season, losing 4–3 to Jimmy Robertson. Soon after this defeat Brecel traveled to Sofia to play in the Bulgarian Open. He won his first round match but was beaten 4–0 by Mark Davis in the second round. He finished 51st on the PTC Order of Merit.

Brecel failed to qualify for the 2012 Shanghai Masters, losing 5–1 in the second round to Andy Hicks. He also failed to qualify for the fourth ranking event of the season, the 2012 International Championship, losing 6–3 to Anthony Hamilton in the third round. Brecel led Barry Pinches 3–0 in qualifying for the 2013 German Masters but was eventually beaten 5–4.

Brecel qualified for the 2012 UK Championship after coming through four rounds of qualifying. He beat Scott Donaldson 6–5, Peter Lines 6–4, Liu Chuang 6–3 and former World Champion Peter Ebdon 6–1, making 5 century breaks in the process, to reach the main draw of a ranking event for the second time. The Belgian won his first ever match in a ranking event by beating Ricky Walden 6–5 in the first round. He followed this up with a 6–4 win over Mark King (notably coming from 0–3 behind) to become the first Belgian player to reach the quarter-finals of a ranking event. He was eventually defeated 6–5 in the quarter-final by Shaun Murphy, having missed a pink which would have given him an opportunity to win on the final black in each of the last two frames.

Following this success, surprisingly, Brecel failed to win any other qualifying match for the rest of the season and therefore could not repeat last year's run to The Crucible, as he was beaten 6–10 by amateur Fraser Patrick in the first round of World Championship Qualifying. He ended his second year as a professional ranked world number 72.

2013/14 season
The 2013–14 season started badly for Brecel as he lost in the qualifying rounds for the first five ranking events. He received automatic entry into the first round of the UK Championship as all 128 players on the tour began the event at the venue and he beat Mike Dunn 6–4, but then lost 6–5 to Stephen Maguire, despite having held a 5–2 lead.
Brecel qualified for the next ranking event, the German Masters, by defeating James Wattana 5–3, but was eliminated by Joe Perry 5–2 in the opening round. Brecel failed to win a match in either of his next two ranking events as Jimmy Robertson defeated him 4–2 in the last 128 of the Welsh Open whilst Ryan Day won a deciding frame in the first round of the World Open to win 5–4. His best result of the year came at the penultimate ranking event of the season, the China Open where he reached the second round thanks to the withdrawal of Mark Allen. Brecel then comfortably beat Dominic Dale 5–1 in the last 16, but missed out on his second career quarter-final as he lost 5–2 against Graeme Dott. In the minor-ranking European Tour events played throughout the season, Brecel advanced to the quarter-finals of the Ruhr Open by seeing off Stuart Bingham 4–1, but was then edged out by Robbie Williams in a deciding frame by 73 points to 72 in a 4–3 defeat. He finished 39th on the European Order of Merit and inside the top 64 in the world ranking for the first time, at number 63.

2014/15 season
The first ranking event Brecel qualified for in the 2014–15 season was the Australian Goldfields Open where he was defeated by Matthew Stevens 5–3 in the opening round. He was whitewashed 6–0 by Mark Allen in the second round of the UK Championship.
At the Welsh Open he defeated world number 15 Robert Milkins 4–0 in the opening round, Tian Pengfei 4–1 and Oliver Brown 4–0. In the Pengfei match he made a break of 140, the highest in his professional career and ultimately the highest in the tournament. Furthermore, he would go on to beat reigning world champion and world number one Mark Selby in the fourth round after a deciding frame (4–3), having been 2–0 and 3–2 down, to reach the quarter-finals. There, Brecel met Ricky Walden, another top 16 player (ranked number 9 at the time). Brecel lost the first three frames, but he followed this up by winning the next five on the trot in order to reach the first ranking semi-final ever of his professional career. Four-time world champion John Higgins beat him 6–4. A pair of quarter-final exits in the European Tour events during the year saw Brecel finish 16th on the Order of Merit to make his debut in the Grand Final, where he lost 4–0 to Judd Trump in the opening round. His good season saw him climb 19 places in the rankings to end it at 44th in the world.

2015/16 season
After failing to qualify for the Australian Goldfields Open and exiting both the Shanghai Masters and International Championship in the first round, Brecel then beat Hossein Vafaei 6–1, Anthony McGill 6–4 and Robin Hull 6–2 to reach the fourth round of the UK Championship. He subsequently lost to Matthew Selt 6–4 after being 3–1 up in the interval. After beating Zhao Xintong 5–2 and Kurt Maflin 5–3 he reached his first quarter-final of the season soon afterwards at the German Masters, where he recovered from 4–2 down to defeat Mark Joyce 5–4, closing the match with a 102 break. Brecel then won a scrappy game 6–3 in the semi-finals against Kyren Wilson to become only the second European player from outside the UK and Ireland, after Tony Drago from Malta almost 20 years ago (when he was defeated by Stephen Hendry at the same stage of the 1997 International Open), to play in a ranking event final and the first one from Belgium. He would lose it 9–5 to Martin Gould, but targeted a top 20 world ranking before the end of the season. He lost in the final of the Snooker Shoot-Out to Robin Hull. Brecel was beaten in the fourth round of the Welsh Open 4–2 by Ding Junhui and, after losing in the first round of three successive ranking events and failing to qualify for the World Championship, he finished the year at 30th in the world, still the highest he has ended a campaign.

2016/17 season
Brecel could not get past the first round of any of the first seven ranking events he entered in the 2016–17 season, before he restricted Shaun Murphy to eight points as he defeated him 4–0 in the opening round of the Northern Ireland Open. He then beat Jamie Cope 4–2, before losing 4–1 to Michael White. At the UK Championship, Brecel whitewashed Aditya Mehta 6–0 and then overcame Sam Craigie 6–5, Yu Delu 6–1 and Stephen Maguire 6–3 to play Murphy in the quarter-finals of the event for the second time. It was nowhere near as close as their previous meeting however, as Murphy easily won 6–1. Brecel qualified for his second World Championship and raced in to a 7–1 lead over Marco Fu in the first round. He also held an 8–4, 9–8 advantage, but would go on to lose 10–9.

2017/18 season
Brecel won his first ranking title, the China Championship in August 2017. He defeated Jimmy Robertson, Marco Fu, and Mike Dunn, before defeating Ronnie O'Sullivan 5–4 in the quarter-finals after being 1–4 down. He then defeated Li Hang 6–5 in the semi-finals, before defeating Shaun Murphy 10–5 in the final. His victory propelled him into the top 16 of the rankings for the first time.

A month later, at the World Open, Brecel confirmed his status as a top 16 player with a semi-final finish, winning three consecutive rounds in a decider, before succumbing to eventual winner Ding Junhui in a 6–4 defeat. He repeated this feat at the Champion of Champions invitational tournament. Brecel whitewashed Judd Trump 4–0 in the first round and went on to beat world champion Mark Selby 6–4 later that day. In the semi-final, he suffered a 6–4 defeat by the hand of Shaun Murphy, who went on to win the tournament.

2018/19 season

In the 2018 Northern Ireland Open, Brecel lost in the last 16 to the eventual tournament winner Judd Trump. He also reached the last 16 in the 2019 Snooker Shoot Out and the semi-finals of the non-ranking 2018 Six-red World Championship and the China Open. In the 2019 World Snooker Championship, he lost 10–9 in the first round to Gary Wilson, with the deciding frame lasting a record 79 minutes and 31 seconds. He finished this season with the same ranking (15) as he had at the start of it.

2019/20 season

Brecel's best result in a ranking tournament in this season was an appearance in the Last 16 in the Welsh Open, in which he lost 4–3 to John Higgins. During this season he dropped out of the top 32. In June 2020, he won the non-ranking Championship League, beating Stuart Bingham in the final group and drawing against Ryan Day and Ben Woollaston.

2020/21 season
This was a poor season for Brecel as he did not make it past the third round in any tournament.

2021/22 season 
Brecel reached the quarterfinals of the English Open where he lost 5–1 to Ronnie O'Sullivan, before reaching the final of the UK Championship. This made him the first player from continental Europe to appear in the final of a Triple Crown event. On his way to the final, Brecel managed to whitewash Stephen Maguire and beat Kyren Wilson 6–4 in the semifinal, with no less than 4 centuries during the match. As runner-up, Brecel moved up the rankings from 40th to 18th. The next week, he went on to win his second ranking event in the Scottish Open.

Performance and rankings timeline

Career finals

Ranking finals: 6 (3 titles)

Non-ranking finals: 2 (1 title)

Pro-am finals: 6 (5 titles)

Amateur titles
 Belgian Under 16 Championship – 2007, 2008, 2009
 Belgium Ranking Events
 St.Martinus Gent – 2007
 Happy Snooker Hasselt – 2009
 Zele – 2010
 Peer – 2011
 Malta Under 16 Open – 2007
 Flemish Under 16 Championship – 2008
 Belgian Teams Championship – 2008
 Belgian Open Under 21 – 2008
 Belgian Under 21 Championship – 2008, 2009
 European Under-19 Championship – 2009
 International Open under 21 – 2009
 Belgian Senior Championship – 2010, 2013, 2014
 European Snooker Championship – 2010

References

External links

 
 English Website
Luca Brecel at worldsnooker.com
 
 Global Snooker Player Profile

1995 births
Living people
Belgian snooker players
People from Dilsen-Stokkem
Sportspeople from Limburg (Belgium)
20th-century Belgian people
21st-century Belgian people